The Central Avenue Bridge is a historic bridge in Batesville, Arkansas. It carries AR 69B and Central Avenue across Poke Bayou on the city's west side. The bridge was built in 1930 by the Luten Bridge Company, and features that company's signature rings in the spandrels, which provide additional strength with a minimal use of additional material.

The bridge was listed on the National Register of Historic Places in 2010.

See also
National Register of Historic Places listings in Independence County, Arkansas
List of bridges on the National Register of Historic Places in Arkansas

References

Road bridges on the National Register of Historic Places in Arkansas
Bridges completed in 1930
Buildings and structures in Batesville, Arkansas
National Register of Historic Places in Independence County, Arkansas
Concrete bridges in the United States
Open-spandrel deck arch bridges in the United States
Transportation in Independence County, Arkansas